Chayce Jones (born 14 January 2000) is a professional Australian rules footballer currently playing for the Adelaide Football Club in the Australian Football League (AFL). He was drafted by the Adelaide Crows with their first selection and ninth overall in the 2018 AFL draft.

Early life
Jones grew up in Longford, Tasmania and also played junior football for the Longford Football Club and cricket club. He moved to Launceston Football Club to play in the Tasmanian Football League. Following an exceptional Under-18 Championship campaign with the Allies in 2018, where he was picked in the Under-18 All Australian team, Jones was projected to be picked up within the top 10 of the 2018 AFL draft. He also surprisingly finished second in the TFL's Player of the Year award with the Launceston Football Club even though he only managed to play five games for the season.

AFL career

2019
Jones made his debut in the first round of the 2019 season against Hawthorn at Adelaide Oval. Jones pushed his way into the  starting lineup as a small forward on the back of the impressive form in the pre-season competition. He showed plenty of promise early, playing six of the first 10 games, before returning for the final two games of the season. Jones looked lively when he was given midfield time in the round 23 loss to the Western Bulldogs. He won the Mark Bickley Emerging Talent Award as the Crows' best young player. On 5 July 2019, with a year still to run on his contract, Jones extended his stay at Adelaide until the end of 2023.

2020
Jones played 15 of the 17 games played in 2020. He showed promising signs of what he can do for the future.

2021
Jones played 15 of a possible 22 games in 2021. Jones has a new role in defence after a talk with senior coach Matthew Nicks and other coaches. Jones wanted to try and get back into the starting 22 and further develop himself into a better footballer, so he thought a move down back would better suit him. The role change was a positive for Jones as he struggled to lock down a role in the Adelaide team. he played in the final 14 games of the 2021 season.

2022
Jones made a positive start of 2022 playing the first 11 rounds (round 11 as the medi-sub) of the season in the back half, before being omitted.

Statistics 
  Statistics are correct to the end of round 20, 2021

|- style="background:#eaeaea;"
! scope="row" style="text-align:center" | 2019
|style="text-align:center;"|
| 20 || 8 || 3 || 8 || 48 || 41 || 89 || 16 || 18 || 0.4 || 1.0 || 6.0 || 5.1 || 11.1 || 2.0 || 2.3 || 0
|- 
! scope="row" style="text-align:center" | 2020
|style="text-align:center;"|
| 1 || 15 || 6 || 1 || 64 || 58 || 122 || 22 || 28 || 0.4 || 0.1 || 4.3 || 3.9 || 8.1 || 1.5 || 1.9 || 0
|- style="background:#eaeaea;"
! scope="row" style="text-align:center" | 2021
|style="text-align:center;"|
| 1 || 15 || 1 || 3 || 128 || 58 || 186 || 43 || 19 || 0.1 || 0.2 || 8.5 || 3.9 || 12.4 || 2.9 || 1.3 || 0
|- style="background:#eaeaea;"
! scope="row" style="text-align:center" | 2022
|style="text-align:center;"|
| 1 || 11 || 0 || 1 || 96 || 46 || 142 || 32 || 17 || 0.0 || 0.1 || 8.7 || 4.2 || 12.9 || 2.9 || 1.6 || 0
|- class="sortbottom"
! colspan=3| Career
! 49
! 10
! 13
! 336
! 203
! 539
! 113
! 82
! 0.2
! 0.3
! 6.9
! 4.1
! 11
! 2.3
! 1.7
! 0
|}

References

External links 

Living people
2000 births
Adelaide Football Club players
Australian rules footballers from Tasmania
Launceston Football Club players